Jonathan David González Valencia (born 3 July 1995) is an Ecuadorian footballer commonly known as "Speedy Gonzalez" currently plays for Mushuc Runa in the Liga PRO Ecuador as a winger.

Club career

Independiente del Valle
González is a youth exponent from Independiente del Valle. He made his debut for Independiente del Valle in Ecuadorian Serie A in 2011.

International career
González was called for Friendlies against United States and El Salvador on October 10 and 14th, 2014 respectively. Gonzalez came in as a sub for Renato Ibarra and made his debut for Ecuador against the United States.

References

External links
 
 ecuafutbol.org

1995 births
Living people
People from Quinindé Canton
Association football wingers
Ecuadorian footballers
Ecuadorian expatriate footballers
C.S.D. Independiente del Valle footballers
Leones Negros UdeG footballers
Club León footballers
Club Olimpia footballers
L.D.U. Quito footballers
C.D. Cuenca footballers
Dorados de Sinaloa footballers
Delfín S.C. footballers
Ecuadorian Serie A players
Liga MX players
Paraguayan Primera División players
Ecuador international footballers
2015 Copa América players
Copa América Centenario players
Ecuadorian expatriate sportspeople in Mexico
Ecuadorian expatriate sportspeople in Paraguay
Expatriate footballers in Mexico
Expatriate footballers in Paraguay
C.S. Norte América footballers